Ben Hmida Mosque, is a Tunisian mosque located in the north of the medina of Tunis, in Bab Souika suburb.

Location
The mosque is located in 2 El Halib dead-end or the milk "dead-end", near Bab Lakouas, one of the medina's gates that disappeared.

History
According to the commemorative plaque at the entrance of the mosque, it was built in 1009, during the era of the zirid dynasty that ruled the Maghreb between 972 and 1014.

References 

Berber architecture
Mosques in Tunis
19th-century mosques